Ferraby Lionheart is the self-titled, self-released debut EP from singer-songwriter Ferraby Lionheart. Ferraby recorded the EP over the course of a few months while still with his then-current band Telecast. He recorded the songs entirely in his "one-room apartment in a two-story building from the 1930s" in Los Angeles, California. The EP was re-released digitally after Ferraby signed a contract with Nettwerk Records.

A music video was produced for the song "A Crack in Time." link

Jason Stare played drums on "The Fighter", "A Crack in Time", "The Ballad of Gus and Sam"

Track listing
 "Tickets to Crickets" - 3:08
 "Won't Be Long" - 3:26
 "The Fighter" - 3:53
 "A Crack in Time" - 3:01
 "The Ballad of Gus and Sam" - 3:31
 "Something to Love" - 3:47

References

2006 EPs
Ferraby Lionheart albums